Atlanticus is a genus of "eastern shieldback" bush crickets or katydids in the tribe Drymadusini.  It has a discontinuous distribution in North America and temperate eastern Asia.

Species
These 59 species belong to the genus Atlanticus:

 Atlanticus abeitaii Liu, 2013
 Atlanticus ahunanensis Liu, 2013
 Atlanticus akangxiani Liu, 2013
 Atlanticus akulingensis Liu, 2013
 Atlanticus americanus (Saussure, 1859) (American shieldback)
 Atlanticus beitaii Liu, 2013
 Atlanticus bikouensis Zheng & Shi, 1999
 Atlanticus brevicaudus Bey-Bienko, 1955
 Atlanticus brunneri (Pylnov, 1914)
 Atlanticus calcaratus Rehn & Hebard, 1916
 Atlanticus changi Tinkham, 1941
 Atlanticus davisi Rehn & Hebard, 1916 (Davis's shieldback)
 Atlanticus donglingi Liu, 2013
 Atlanticus dorsalis (Burmeister, 1838)
 Atlanticus fairyi Liu, 2013
 Atlanticus fallax He, 2018
 Atlanticus fengyangensis Liu, 2013
 Atlanticus gibbosus (Scudder, 1894) (robust shieldback)
 Atlanticus glaber Rehn & Hebard, 1912
 Atlanticus grahami Tinkham, 1941
 Atlanticus hefengensis Liu, 2013
 Atlanticus helleri Liu, Wang & Cheng, 2016
 Atlanticus hoffmanni Tinkham, 1941
 Atlanticus huangfu Liu, 2013
 Atlanticus huangshanensis Shi & Zheng, 1994
 Atlanticus hunanensis Du & Shi, 2005
 Atlanticus interval He, 2018
 Atlanticus jeholensis Mori, 1935
 Atlanticus jiangyei Liu, Wang & Cheng, 2016
 Atlanticus jiuchongensis Liu, 2013
 Atlanticus jixiani Liu, 2013
 Atlanticus kangi Liu, 2013
 Atlanticus kangxiani Liu, 2013
 Atlanticus karnyi Ebner, 1939
 Atlanticus kiangsu Ramme, 1939
 Atlanticus kulingensis Tinkham, 1941
 Atlanticus kwangtungensis Tinkham, 1941
 Atlanticus macropterus Liu, 2013
 Atlanticus magnificus Tinkham, 1941
 Atlanticus medius Liu, 2013
 Atlanticus minimus Liu, 2013
 Atlanticus minor Liu, 2013
 Atlanticus monticola Davis, 1915 (least shieldback)
 Atlanticus pachymerus (Burmeister, 1838) (southern protean shieldback)
 Atlanticus palpalis Rehn & Hebard, 1920
 Atlanticus parabeitaii Liu, 2013
 Atlanticus parakangxiani Liu, 2013
 Atlanticus pieli Tinkham, 1941
 Atlanticus plateau Liu, 2013
 Atlanticus qinshuii Liu, 2013
 Atlanticus robustus Bey-Bienko, 1951
 Atlanticus ruichengi Liu, 2013
 Atlanticus scudderi (Bruner, 1886)
 Atlanticus sinensis Uvarov, 1924
 Atlanticus testaceus Scudder, 1901 (protean shieldback)
 Atlanticus wudangensis Liu, 2013
 Atlanticus yashani Liu, 2013
 Atlanticus zhongyangi Liu, 2013
 Atlanticus zhouzhii Liu, 2013

References

Further reading

 

Tettigoniinae
Articles created by Qbugbot